Saint Ann South Western is a parliamentary constituency represented in the House of Representatives of the Jamaican Parliament. It elects one Member of Parliament by the first past the post system of election. The constituency consists of the south-west part of Saint Ann Parish. It is represented by Labour Party MP Zavia Mayne.

Members of Parliament 

 Ernie Smith (2002 to 2011)
 Zavia Mayne (2016 - present)

References 

Parliamentary constituencies of Jamaica